Homer S. Ferguson (1889–1982), U.S. Senator from Michigan from 1943 to 1955. Senator Ferguson may also refer to:

Benjamin Ferguson (politician) (1820–1888), Wisconsin State Senate
Bill Ferguson (politician) (born 1983), Maryland State Senate
Robert E. Ferguson (1924–2016), New Mexico State Senate
Sue Ramsey Johnston Ferguson (1897–1977), North Carolina State Senate
Timothy R. Ferguson (born 1955), Maryland State Senate
Virgil Ferguson (1844–1912), Illinois State Senate